Hurricane (variant name: Hurricane Church) is an unincorporated community in Madison County, North Carolina, United States. The community is named after Little Hurricane Creek, a tributary of Big Laurel Creek and is centered at the intersection of US 25/US 70 and NC 208.  The community is part of the Asheville Metropolitan Statistical Area.

References

Unincorporated communities in Madison County, North Carolina
Unincorporated communities in North Carolina